Ronald Reagan (1911–2004) was the president of the United States from 1981 to 1989.

Reagan may also refer to:

Places

United States
 Reagan, Indiana
 Reagan, Henderson County, Tennessee
 Reagan, McMinn County, Tennessee
 Reagan, Texas
 Reagan County, Texas

Other uses
 Reagan (given name), a given name and list of people with the given name
 Reagan (surname), a surname and list of people with the surname
 Reagan (2011 film), an American documentary film
 Reagan (2023 film), an American biographical drama film
 Reagan (EP), an EP by Whirlwind Heat
 "Reagan", track from Killer Mike's album R.A.P. Music

See also
 Emperor Reigen
 List of things named after Ronald Reagan
 Raygun (disambiguation)
 The Reagan Diaries, an edited version of diaries written by Ronald Reagan
 Regan (disambiguation)
 Ronald Reagan (disambiguation)